"Tragedy and Mystery" is a song by China Crisis. It was released as the first single from their 1983 album Working with Fire and Steel – Possible Pop Songs Volume Two and reached number 46 on the UK Singles Chart.

Track listing
UK 7" single / 7" picture disc
"Tragedy and Mystery"
"A Golden Handshake for Every Daughter"

UK 12" single
"Tragedy and Mystery" – 5.25
"A Golden Handshake for Every Daughter" - 3.57

References

1983 singles
1983 songs
China Crisis songs
Virgin Records singles
Song recordings produced by Mike Howlett